Julián is the Spanish equivalent of the name Julian. Notable people with the name include:

 Julián, Julián Cuesta, Spanish footballer
 Julián Orbón (1925–1991) Cuban composer
 Julián Carrón (1950) Spanish Catholic theologian
 Julián Robles (1981) Spanish footballer
 Julián Vara (1983) Spanish footballer
 Julián Infante (1957–2000) Spanish guitarist and song writer
 Julián Marías (1914–2005) Spanish philosopher associated with the Generation of '36 movement
 Julián Herranz Casado (1930) Spanish Cardinal of the Catholic Church
 Julián Besteiro (1870–1940) Spanish socialist politician
 Julián Sánchez (cyclist) (1980) Spanish professional road bicycle racer
 Julián Grimau (1911–1963) Spanish Communist activist
 Julián Retegi (1954– ) ex-player of Basque pelota
 Julián Simón Spanish motorcycle racer
 Juli, Julián Cerdá Vicente (1981) Spanish footballer
 Julián de Olivares (1895–1977) Spanish fencer
 Julián Juderías (1877–1918) Spanish historian and sociologist
 Julián Zugazagoitia member of the Spanish Socialist Workers' Party, editor of the El Socialista
 Julián Miralles (1965) Spanish motorcycle racer

See also 
 San Julián (disambiguation), toponyms

References 

Spanish masculine given names